The African five-lined skink (Trachylepis quinquetaeniata, formerly Mabuya quinquetaeniata), sometimes called rainbow mabuya, is a species of African skink in the subfamily Lygosominae. T. margaritifera is also known as the rainbow skink.

Taxonomy
The species has two subspecies:
 Trachylepis quinquetaeniata quinquetaeniata (Lichtenstein, 1823)
 Trachylepis quinquetaeniata riggenbachi (Sternfeld, 1910)

Trachylepis margaritifera, formerly treated as a subspecies of T. quinquetaeniata, was elevated to full species status in 1998.

Description
The coloration of this species is quite variable, depending on the gender and the age. The scales are glossy, with metallic reflections. The basic colour is usually olive-brown or dark brown, sometimes with pearly whitish spots and with three light olive or dark brown stripes running from the head to the electric blue tail. These stripes may fade and become indistinct in the adults.

The head shows a pointed snout and clearly visible ears holes. Just behind the ear opening, there are some black spots. Legs are dark brown, short and strong, with relatively long toes. The flanks are mainly yellowish and the underside of the body is whitish.

Distribution
The species is found in Egypt and southern Africa It has been found across the African continent and is also an invasive species in Florida.

Captivity 
This species is found in the reptile trade. This trade is responsible for the groups of mabuya now found in Florida  and California

Habitat 
These skinks are found in both rocky and grassland habitats. They tend to make their homes on trees, but also can be found using manmade structures for this purpose.

Behavior

Diet 
This species' diet consists of mostly insects, particularly beetles, butterflies, and ants, with little to no variation between the diet of males and females.

References

 Trachylepis quinquetaeniata, Reptiles Database

External links 
 
 

Trachylepis
Reptiles described in 1823
Taxa named by Hinrich Lichtenstein